Platanthera ephemerantha is a species of orchid known by the common names whiteflower rein orchid, slender white piperia, and white-flowered piperia. It is native to western North America from Alaska to the San Francisco Bay Area, where it grows in coniferous forests and other habitat in coastal and inland mountain ranges within 150 kilometers of the coast. It grows erect to about half a meter in maximum height from a bulbous caudex. The basal leaves are up to 18 centimeters long by 3 wide. Leaves higher on the stem are much reduced. The upper part of the stem is a spikelike inflorescence of up to 100 small flowers, mostly arranged along one side of the stem. The fragrant, honey-scented flowers are whiter than those of other Platanthera, but sometimes green-tinged or -veined, or green with white margins. The status of this species in the wild is difficult to determine because most populations are small and may produce flowers only rarely.

References

External links
 Jepson Manual Treatment
 USDA Plants Profile
 Flora of North America
 Photo gallery

ephemerantha
Orchids of California
Orchids of Canada
Orchids of the United States
Flora of the West Coast of the United States
Flora of Alaska
Flora of the Klamath Mountains
Natural history of the California Coast Ranges
Natural history of the San Francisco Bay Area
Plants described in 1990
Flora without expected TNC conservation status